Sri Ramulayya is a 1999 Telugu-language biographical film, based on the life of Paritala Sriramulu, father of politician Paritala Ravindra, directed by N. Shankar. The film stars Mohan Babu, Nandamuri Harikrishna and Soundarya. The film was a box office hit and won two Nandi Awards.

Cast

 Mohan Babu 
 Nandamuri Harikrishna 
 Soundarya 
 Srihari
 Kota Srinivasa Rao
 Mannava Balayya
 Ranjitha
 Jeeva
 Nutan Prasad
 Jayaprakash Reddy
 Brahmaji
 Paruchuri Venkateswara Rao
 Sivaparvathi
 Radha Prasanthi
 Shanoor Sana
 Telangana Shakuntala
 Raghunatha Reddy
 P. L. Narayana
 Prathyusha
 Alapati Lakshmi
 Bramhanandam
 AVS
 M S Narayana
 Venu Madhav
 Chalapathi Rao
 Mohan Raj
 Raja Ravindra
 Narra Venkateswara Rao
 Ashok Kumar
 Bandla Ganesh
 Naveen
 Padma Jayanth

Soundtrack
The music and background score was composed by Vandemataram Srinivas.

Awards
Nandi Awards
Best Male Playback Singer - Vandemataram Srinivas
Special Jury Award - Srihari

References

External links
 

1999 films
1990s Telugu-language films
Indian biographical films
Films scored by Vandemataram Srinivas
Indian films about revenge
Indian epic films
Indian political thriller films
Indian crime thriller films
Indian films based on actual events
Films directed by N. Shankar
1999 crime thriller films
1990s political thriller films